Régis Gustave Lepreux (28 March 1913 – 10 August 1979) was a French weightlifter. He competed in the men's middleweight event at the 1936 Summer Olympics.

References

External links
 

1913 births
1979 deaths
French male weightlifters
Olympic weightlifters of France
Weightlifters at the 1936 Summer Olympics
Sportspeople from Nord (French department)